The cotuero toadfish (Batrachoides manglae) is a species of toadfish found in tropical waters along the Atlantic Coasts of Colombia and Venezuela. It is of minor importance in commercial fisheries.

References

cotuero toadfish
Fish of the Caribbean
Fish of Colombia
Fish of Venezuela
cotuero toadfish
cotuero toadfish
Taxonomy articles created by Polbot